Open at Night (original title: Ouvert la nuit) is a 2016 French comedy-drama film written and directed by Édouard Baer and starring Baer, Sabrina Ouazani and Audrey Tautou. It was released on 11 January 2017.

Cast 
 Édouard Baer as Luigi
 Sabrina Ouazani as Faeza
 Audrey Tautou as Nawel
 Christophe Meynet as Chris
 Jean-Michel Lahmi as Théo
 Grégory Gadebois as Marcel
 Patrick Boshart as Monsieur Pat 
 Marie-Ange Casta as Clara
 Alka Balbir as Karine 
 Lionel Abelanski as Lolo
 Atmen Kélif as Kamel
 Christine Murillo as Madame Pelissier
 Michel Galabru as himself
 Yoshi Oida as Atsuhiko Dazai
 Michel Fau as Bar manager
 Guilaine Londez as The guardian

References

External links 
 

2016 films
2016 comedy-drama films
2010s French-language films
French comedy-drama films
Films directed by Édouard Baer
2016 comedy films
2010s French films